Charlotte "Eppy" Epstein, (1884-1938), coached the United States Women's Olympic Swimming Team in the 1920s and founded the Women's Swimming Association. She was known as "Mother of Women's Swimming in America".

Career
Epstein was born in 1884 in New York City to Morris and Sara (Rosenau) Epstein.

In 1914, Epstein founded the National Women's Life Saving League, which offered competitive swimming, lessons, and socialization for female swimmers. That same year she convinced the board of directors of the Amateur Athletic Union to allow female swimmers to register as AAU athletes.

In 1917, she worked as a stenographer until she founded the Women's Swimming Association (WSA) with the help of a few other friends. The WSA became famous for promoting the health benefits of swimming as exercise.  This was at a time when women were not viewed as athletic, and exercise was not considered beneficial to female health. Prior to this, Epstein started the National Women's Life Saving League to help create a swimming culture for women and girls.

Epstein coached the Women's Olympic Swimming Team in the 1920s.  She was able to guide many of the WSA members to victory.  Through her coaching, swimmers under her management, known as "Eppie's Swimmers," won 30 national championships, while setting 52 world records.

She battled for women's suffrage, staging “suffrage swim races” with her teammates, as well as battling for emancipation in women's sports campaigning for bathing suit reform, distance swims, and other competitive events.  Epstein served as the team leader for Olympian Gertrude Ederle, who learned to swim at the Women's Swimming Association. In 1926 Ederle became the first woman to swim the English Channel beating the men's time by over two hours.

Epstein served as manager of the U.S. Women's Olympic Swimming Team for the 1920, 1924, and 1928 Olympic Games, and became well known as a spokesperson for female athletes. She boycotted 1936 Summer Olympics in Berlin to protest Nazi policies.

She died shortly after, in 1938.

Awards 

 1974, inducted to the International Swimming Hall of Fame
 1982, inducted to the Jewish Sports Hall of Fame, in Israel
 1994, first woman inducted into the B'nai B'rith Klutznick National Jewish Museum, Jewish Sports Hall of Fame in Washington, D.C.

See also
 List of members of the International Swimming Hall of Fame
List of select Jewish coaches

References

External links

1884 births
1938 deaths
Jewish swimmers
American female swimmers
Jewish American sportspeople